In artificial intelligence, the distributed multi-agent reasoning system (dMARS) was a platform for intelligent software agents developed at the AAII that makes uses of the belief–desire–intention software model (BDI). The design for dMARS was an extension of the intelligent agent cognitive architecture developed at SRI International called procedural reasoning system (PRS). The most recent incarnation of this framework is the JACK Intelligent Agents platform.

Overview
dMARS was an agent-oriented development and implementation environment written in C++ for building complex, distributed, time-critical systems.

See also
 Australian Artificial Intelligence Institute
 Intelligent agent
 JACK Intelligent Agents
 AgentSpeak

References
 d'Inverno, M., Luck, M., Georgeff, M., Kinny, D. and Wooldridge, M. (2004) "The dMARS Architecture: A Specification of the Distributed Multi-Agent Reasoning System". Journal of Autonomous Agents and Multi-Agent Systems. pp. 5–53.
 Mark d'Inverno, David Kinny, Michael Luck, and Michael Wooldridge. "A Formal Specification of dMARS". In Proceedings of the Fourth International Workshop on Agent Theories, Architectures, and Languages, ATAL'97 appears in Lecture Notes in Artificial Intelligence, volume 1365, pages 155–76, 1997.
 Michael Peter Georgeff, Anand S. Rao, "A profile of the Australian Artificial Intelligence Institute," IEEE Intelligent Systems, vol. 11, no. 6, pp. 89–92, December 1996.

External links
 dMARS Product Brief on the AAII website via the Internet Archive

Multi-agent systems
SRI International software